Şerif Yaçağaz (1876 – 5 October 1938) was a Turkish career officer, civil servant and antisemitic  politician, who served as an officer in the Ottoman Army and the Turkish Army. His antisemitic and anti-communist lectures drew the attention of Turkish nationalist Nihâl Atsız.

Medals and decorations
Order of Osminieh with Sword
Order of the Medjidie
Gallipoli Star (Ottoman Empire)
Silver Medal of Liyakat
Silver Medal of Imtiyaz
Medal of Independence with Red Ribbon

See also
List of high-ranking commanders of the Turkish War of Independence

Sources

1876 births
1938 deaths
People from Pazardzhik
Place of death missing
Ottoman Military Academy alumni
Ottoman Army officers
Ottoman military personnel of the Balkan Wars
Ottoman military personnel of World War I
Turkish Army officers
Turkish military personnel of the Greco-Turkish War (1919–1922)
Republican People's Party (Turkey) politicians
Burials at Turkish State Cemetery
Recipients of the Order of the Medjidie
Recipients of the Liakat Medal
Recipients of the Imtiyaz Medal
Recipients of the Medal of Independence with Red Ribbon (Turkey)
Antisemitism in Turkey